"Bück dich" ("Bend down," "Bend over") is a song by the Neue Deutsche Härte band Rammstein that first appeared on their second studio album, Sehnsucht, and as one of the B-sides to the CD version of "Du hast".

Live performance and controversy

Despite being so popular, this song was never officially released as a single from the band, and never had an accompanying music video. However, the song is widely known by fans, primarily because of the live performance that accompanies it and is generally accepted as a fan favorite.

When performing it live, vocalist Till Lindemann has simulated anal sex with keyboardist Christian Lorenz using a liquid squirting dildo. Christian Lorenz has confirmed in an interview that the dildo squirts a mixture of Pernod liqueur and water; however, bandmate Paul Landers claims it's water and Ouzo (both are anise liqueurs).

Due to the controversial nature of the act, Lindemann and Lorenz were both arrested after a concert held on June 5, 1999 in Worcester, Massachusetts. They were each fined $200 and spent the night in jail. Consequently, three versions of Rammstein's Live aus Berlin were released - one VHS including "Bück dich", another VHS and DVD without it and the uncensored DVD including the song.

Comeback
The song made a comeback in the Made in Germany 1995–2011 tour. Early during the US tour dates, the live performance was changed into more of a BDSM/torture scenario in which Christian Lorenz rubs a lit fluorescent lamp over Till Lindemann's body before smashing it over his head. On some later shows, Till "vomits" with the use of a mask that has the same mechanism as the dildo in regular performances.

During Rammstein's unofficial "Wir halten das Tempo" tour in 2013, the band performed the intro of their song with guitar flamethrowers before, during and end of the song "Bück dich", where Till destroys the keyboard, throws it into the crowd and then kicks the standing keyboard onstage.

References

Rammstein songs
Obscenity controversies in music
1997 songs
Songs written by Richard Z. Kruspe
Songs written by Paul Landers
Songs written by Till Lindemann
Songs written by Christian Lorenz
Songs written by Oliver Riedel
Songs written by Christoph Schneider